KHLM-LD (channel 12) is a low-power religious television station in Houston, Texas, United States, owned and operated by the Christian Television Network. The station's transmitter is located near Missouri City, in unincorporated northeastern Fort Bend County.

History
In its early years, this station did not broadcast a TV service at all. Instead, it was used to run an Internet Service Provider called AccelerNet, which delivered the downstream part of the service using UHF channel 43 and the upstream using a traditional dial-up modem or ISDN line.

Prior to 2020, KHLM-LD was the American flagship of the Monterrey, Nuevo León-based network Multimedios, and coordinated many of that network's talent appearances around the Houston area and southern Texas. Its local programming was also carried over the American feed of the network for cable and satellite providers, replacing Monterrey only-specific content.

The station temporarily ceased over-the-air broadcasting as of December 1, 2018 in preparation for the broadcast band repack in 2019 and a re-sort from UHF channel 43 onto VHF channel 10. KHLM-LD's main channel carrying Multimedios Houston is still available as a basic offering on most of the area's cable providers.

On June 4, 2021, it was announced that Lotus Communications would sell KHLM-LD to the Christian Television Network for $1.1 million. The sale was completed on August 18.

Subchannels
The station's digital signal is multiplexed:

References

HLM-LD
Christian Television Network affiliates
Television channels and stations established in 1996
Low-power television stations in the United States
1996 establishments in Texas